The "Jäger March" (originally "Jääkärien marssi"), is a military march by Jean Sibelius. He set in 1917 words written by the Finnish Jäger, Hilfsgruppenführer Heikki Nurmio who served in Libau, in the Royal Prussian 27th Jäger Battalion of the Imperial German Army. This unit was fighting against the Russian Empire, of which the Grand Duchy of Finland still was a part. The words were smuggled into Finland to Sibelius, who composed the song in Järvenpää.

Sibelius wrote the "Jäger March" originally for men's chorus and piano, and later arranged it for men's chorus and symphony orchestra. The first public performance of Jäger March was in Helsinki on 19 January 1918 by the choir Akademiska sångföreningen, led by Olof Wallin. The Finnish Civil War began on the same day between the White and the Red troops. The march is the honorary march of many army detachments  such as the Lapland Military Band from Rovaniemi.

Lyrics

References

External links 
 
 Jääkärimarssi Lyrics
 Jääkärien marssi (sound clip, 28 seconds, 488 kB, MP3) presented by Pohjanmaan Sotilassoittokunta (Pohjanmaa Military Band) in the military music homepage of Finnish Defence Forces
 Pushkin Quintett: The Jäger March — new version (YouTube)
 Jäger March on Youtube (Instrumental)
 Jäger March on Youtube (With vocals)

Compositions by Jean Sibelius
Finnish military marches
1917 compositions